Roydon Leslie Hayes (born 9 May 1971) is a former New Zealand cricketer who played one One Day International in 1995.

References

1971 births
Living people
New Zealand One Day International cricketers
New Zealand cricketers
Northern Districts cricketers
People from Paeroa
Cricketers from Waikato